The following is an alphabetical list of members of the United States House of Representatives from the state of Wisconsin.  For chronological tables of members of both houses of the United States Congress from the state (through the present day), see United States congressional delegations from Wisconsin.

Current members 
Updated January 3, 2023.
 : Bryan Steil (R) (since 2019)
 : Mark Pocan (D) (since 2013)
 : Derrick Van Orden (R) (since 2023)
 : Gwen Moore (D) (since 2005)
 : Scott L. Fitzgerald (R) (since 2021)
 : Glenn Grothman (R) (since 2015)
 : Tom Tiffany (R) (since 2020)
 : Mike Gallagher (R) (since 2017)

List of members and delegates

See also

List of United States senators from Wisconsin
United States congressional delegations from Wisconsin
Wisconsin's congressional districts

References

Wisconsin
United States rep